Hate Bazare Express is an Express train belonging to Eastern Railway zone of Indian Railways that run between  and  in India. The name of the train is derived from the Bengali word Hate Bazare which means The Market place in English and also its a name of the novel wrote by Balai Chand Mukhopadhyay (Banaphool). Hate Bazare Express is the successor of the former North Bihar Express.

Service
There are two sets of Hate Bazare Express which the first set runs as the train numbers 13163 / 13164 and the second set run as train numbers 13169 / 13170.

Routes

Traction
 The first set is hauled by WAP-4 of Electric Loco Shed, Howrah or WAP-7 of  throughout the entire journey.
 The second set is hauled by WDM-3 of Howrah or WDP-4 of  throughout the journey.

Incident
On 12 July 2011, Hate Bazare Express has averted a train collision with the EMU local of Bandel–Katwa at Balagarh station in Hooghly district of West Bengal, no casualties reported.

External links
 13163 Hate Bazare Express
 13164 Hate Bazare Express
 13169 Hate Bazare Express
 13170 Hate Bazare Express

References

Named passenger trains of India
Transport in Kolkata
Transport in Saharsa
Rail transport in West Bengal
Rail transport in Bihar